Norberto Odebrecht (October 9, 1920 – July 19, 2014) was a Brazilian engineer, businessman and philanthropist. He was the founder of Odebrecht.

Early life
Norberto Odebrecht was born on October 9, 1920 in Recife, Brazil. He studied at the Polytechnic School of Bahia.

Career
Odebrecht founded a construction company from which the Odebrecht Group in Salvador da Bahia was created in 1944.  Today, the company has become an international conglomerate and employs more than 167,500 people in over 60 countries around the globe.

In 1991, he passed the presidency of Odebrecht to his son Emílio Odebrecht, and remained as chairman.

Norberto Odebrecht's "thoughts" have been compiled in three volumes distributed to all employees of the group.

Philanthropy
Odebrecht was the founder of the Brazilian Odebrecht Foundation (Portuguese: Fundação Odebrecht).

Death
Odebrecht died on 19 July 2014, aged 93, in Salvador, Bahia.

References

Brazilian engineers
Brazilian businesspeople
1920 births
2014 deaths
Odebrecht family
Brazilian people of German descent
Brazilian billionaires